Saucrobotys is a genus of moths of the family Crambidae.

Species
Saucrobotys fumoferalis (Hulst, 1886)
Saucrobotys futilalis (Lederer, 1863)

References

External links
Natural History Museum Lepidoptera genus database

Pyraustinae
Crambidae genera
Taxa named by Eugene G. Munroe